Raúl Osvaldo Urra da Forno (3 July 1930 – July 2014) was a Chilean basketball player. He competed in the men's tournament at the 1956 Summer Olympics.

References

External links

1930 births
2014 deaths
Chilean men's basketball players
1954 FIBA World Championship players
Olympic basketball players of Chile
Basketball players at the 1956 Summer Olympics
Sportspeople from Santiago
Place of death missing